Durlston Bay (also known as Durdlestone Bay) is a small bay next to a country park of the same name, just south of the resort of Swanage, on the Isle of Purbeck in Dorset, England. It has been a renowned site for Lower Cretaceous fossils since the initial discovery of fragments there by Samuel Beckles in the 1850s.

See also 
 List of Dorset beaches

References

External links 
 Durlston Bay; Introduction and Upper Purbeck: Geology of the Wessex Coast by I. M. West, 2005.

Isle of Purbeck
Bays of Dorset
Beaches of Dorset
Jurassic Coast
Swanage